Viktorija Golubic (born 16 October 1992) is a Swiss professional tennis player. Golubic has won one singles title on the WTA Tour, two singles WTA Challenger titles, as well as ten singles and 15 doubles titles on the ITF Circuit so far. On 28 February 2022, she reached her career-high singles ranking of world No. 35. On 15 January 2018, she peaked at No. 63 in the doubles rankings.

Professional career

2008–15: ITF Circuit
Golubic started playing on the ITF Women's Circuit at the $10k event in Budapest in June 2008. She played her first two WTA qualifying tournaments at the Hungarian Open and Gastein Ladies in 2010. She made her WTA Tour main-draw debut at the Gastein Ladies in 2013, where she recorded her first WTA win and reached second round. However, all of her attempts to qualify for a major failed.

2016: Breakthrough, WTA Tour title, top 100

After winning her eighth ITF title at the $25k event in Hong Kong, Golubic reached her first Grand Slam main draw at the Australian Open through qualifying and lost to Carla Suárez Navarro in the first round of the tournament. She then reached the quarterfinals of another ITF event before failing to reach the main draw of her next three tournaments. At the Katowice Open, Golubic entered the main draw as a qualifier and beat Paula Kania in the first round before losing to Tímea Babos.

Prior to the French Open, Golubic played in the qualifying of the WTA Prague Open but lost to Viktória Kužmová in the first round. After a quarterfinal appearance at the $50k Open Saint-Gaudens, she entered French Open through qualifying and earned her first Grand Slam main-draw win with a three-set victory over Alison Riske. She lost to Lucie Šafářová in round two.

Golubic started her grass-court season at the Rosmalen Championships, entering the main draw as a qualifier and defeating Anna-Lena Friedsam and Risa Ozaki en route to her first WTA quarterfinal, before losing to Belinda Bencic. Her next two tournaments (the Mallorca Open and Wimbledon) ended in qualifying. She also lost in the first round of her next ITF tournament in Budapest.

At the inaugural Ladies Championship Gstaad, Golubic beat No. 7 seed Mona Barthel, Evgeniya Rodina, Carina Witthöft and Rebeka Masarova en route to her first WTA tournament final. She then defeated third seed Kiki Bertens to lift her first WTA trophy. With the title, Golubic entered the top 100 for the first time. Golubic reached another final at the Linz Open, in which she was defeated by Dominika Cibulková. On her way to the final, she made her first top-10 win by defeating world No. 6, Garbiñe Muguruza, in the quarterfinal. She ended the season as No. 57 in the WTA rankings.

2017–20: Struggle with form, first major third round, WTA 125 title

In 2017, Golubic could not emulate her results of the previous year. Despite winning only four matches in the first half of the season, she reached a new career-high singles ranking of 51, in April 2017. After that, she started to fall in the ranking and dropped out of the top 100 again. However, she had good results again in the late season. In October, she reached semifinals of the Linz Open, before losing to Magdaléna Rybáriková. It was her first singles semifinal on WTA Tour since October 2016. She then played on the WTA Challenger Tour, where she reached two semifinals, at the Hua Hin Championships and the Taipei Challenger. 

Golubic's most significant results in 2018 came at the ITF Circuit and WTA Challenger Tour. In the early season, she reached the final of the $60k Burnie International, losing there to Marta Kostyuk. Later, she reached quarterfinals of the Indian Wells Challenger, $100k Open de Cagnes-sur-Mer, Bol Open and Manchester Trophy. In October, she won the $80k Poitiers event, defeating Natalia Vikhlyantseva in the final. In June 2018, Golubic after almost one year reentered the top 100. She finished the year as world No. 92.

In the early 2019 season, Golubic reached the quarterfinal of the Thailand Open, where she lost to Tamara Zidanšek. She then won her biggest title since 2016 at the Indian Wells Challenger, saving a championship point against Jennifer Brady in the final. On her way to the title, she knocked out top seed Wang Qiang to mark her first top-20 win since October 2016. 

At Wimbledon, she reached the third round of a major for the first time by defeating Iga Świątek and Yulia Putintseva, but then lost to Dayana Yastremska. 

In September, she reached quarterfinals of the Jiangxi International Open, losing there to Elena Rybakina. She followed this with a semifinal appearance at the Guangzhou International Open, before losing to Samantha Stosur. 

Golubic struggled with form during the following season. Her most significant result came at the $80k Open de Cagnes-sur-Mer in September, when she reached quarterfinals and lost to Sara Sorribes Tormo. She suffered first-round losses at the Australian Open and US Open, while she failed in the qualifying of the French Open. Golubic fell out of the top 100 in late February and finished the year as world No. 137.

2021: First Grand Slam quarterfinal, top 50 debut
Ranked world No. 66 at Wimbledon, Golubic reached a Grand Slam quarterfinal for the first time defeating en-route two seeded players, 23rd seed American Madison Keys in the fourth round and 29th seed Veronika Kudermetova, plus two more Americans, Danielle Collins and Madison Brengle, respectively. Having won 43 matches already in 2021, Golubic guaranteed herself a top-50 debut with this breakthrough run, moving 18 places to world No. 48 on 12 July 2021, having never passed the third round of this major before.

2022–23: Top 35 debut, Indian Wells fourth round, out of top 100
At the Indian Wells Open, she reached the fourth round at a WTA 1000-level for the first time in her career before losing to Elena Rybakina. Because she could not defend her points at the Wimbledon Championships, she fell out of the top 100 on 18 July 2022.

National representation

Fed Cup
Playing for Switzerland at the Fed Cup, Golubic has a win–loss record of 6–6. At the 2016 Fed Cup semifinals, Golubic earned surprising wins over Karolína Plíšková and Barbora Strýcová, defeating both in three sets. Although it was not enough for Switzerland to beat the Czech Republic, Golubic was praised for her performance.

Olympics
In her first Olympics participation at the 2020 Tokyo Olympics, Golubic advanced to the doubles final with Belinda Bencic by defeating Brazilian pair Laura Pigossi and Luisa Stefani.

Performance timelines

Only main-draw results in WTA Tour, Grand Slam tournaments, Fed Cup/Billie Jean King Cup and Olympic Games are included in win–loss records.

Singles
Current after the 2023 Merida Open.

Doubles

Significant finals

Olympic Games

Doubles: 1 (silver medal)

WTA Tour career finals

Singles: 4 (1 title, 3 runner–ups)

Doubles: 2 (2 runner–ups)

WTA Challenger finals

Singles: 3 (2 titles, 1 runner-up)

ITF Circuit finals

Singles: 20 (10 titles, 10 runner–ups)

Doubles: 32 (15 titles, 17 runner–ups)

Head-to-head record

Top 10 wins

Notes

References

External links
 Official website 

 
 
 

1992 births
Living people
Tennis players from Zürich
Swiss female tennis players
Swiss people of Serbian descent
Swiss people of Croatian descent
Olympic tennis players of Switzerland
Tennis players at the 2020 Summer Olympics
Olympic silver medalists for Switzerland
Olympic medalists in tennis
Medalists at the 2020 Summer Olympics